"Mother Knows Best" is a song written by composer Alan Menken and lyricist Glenn Slater for Disney's animated film Tangled (2010). Included on the film's soundtrack album, it was recorded by American actress and singer Donna Murphy as Mother Gothel, the film's main villain, and details the character's efforts to frighten Rapunzel into remaining within the confines of their secluded tower so she can continue exploiting her hair's regenerative properties. A musical theatre-inspired pop ballad lyrically consisting of passive-aggressive insults, the song's upbeat melody belies its dark lyrics about fearmongering, lying, and manipulation. Gothel eventually reprises "Mother Knows Best" in a more vengeful, sinister manner once Rapunzel openly defies her for the first time.

Menken and Slater deliberately wrote "Mother Knows Best" in the style of an old-fashioned Broadway musical number at the behest of directors Byron Howard and Nathan Greno, despite Menken's initial concerns that it sounded too different from the film's other songs. Musically, "Mother Knows Best" contrasts with the singer-songwriter style of Rapunzel's songs performed by pop singer Mandy Moore. A Tony Award-winning Broadway performer, Murphy recorded "Mother Knows Best" by envisioning Gothel as a person who revels in the spotlight and enjoys being the center of attention.

"Mother Knows Best" has garnered widespread acclaim from film and music critics, who cited it as the film's best song. Murphy's vocal performance has also been praised, comparing it to actresses Patti LuPone and Julie Andrews. Additionally, the song has drawn comparisons to the work of Broadway composer and lyricist Stephen Sondheim, as well as songs from the musical Les Misérables and Disney's own The Hunchback of Notre Dame (1996), another Menken project.

Writing and recording
"Mother Knows Best" was written by composer Alan Menken and lyricist Glenn Slater. Menken and Slater wrote "Mother Knows Best" for Tangled (2010) as a musical theater-inspired song at the behest of directors Byron Howard and Nathan Greno, who specifically requested "a musical theatre moment" for the film's main villain, Mother Gothel. Menken was initially concerned that "Mother Knows Best" was unsuitable for the film because its style differed greatly from the singer-songwriter approach they had used to write its other songs, most of which are performed by pop singer Mandy Moore. Before writing "Mother Knows Best", Menken and Slater selected appropriate moments throughout the film during which its main characters could sing, ultimately determining that "Mother Knows Best" "flows directly out of the conflict between" Gothel and Rapunzel.

Menken found writing "Mother Knows Best" challenging due to the subtlety required in order not to reveal the true nature of Gothel and Rapunzel's complex relationship. Menken explained that, in addition to establishing that the characters do love each other to an extent, the song was also tasked with discussing the serious topic of emotional abuse in a delicate enough manner appropriate for a Disney film. Furthermore, Menken observed similarities between Gothel and Claude Frollo from The Hunchback of Notre Dame (1996), a Disney villain he had also written songs for. One of the song's lines, "getting kind of chubby", was borrowed from a conversation the directors had with several female employees about their own complicated relationships with their mothers. Ultimately, Menken was pleased with "Mother Knows Best", despite his initial reservations.

"Mother Knows Best" was recorded by actress and singer Donna Murphy. Primarily a stage performer, Murphy had never voiced an animated character before spontaneously auditioning for Tangled. Because the film is a musical, all candidates were required to audition one song of their choice, with Murphy singing "Children Will Listen" from the musical Into the Woods. Having previously worked with her on his musical Little Shop of Horrors, Menken said Murphy "brought musical theater expertise" to the song. Because of the actress' extensive musical theatre background, Menken and the directors welcomed her suggestions about Gothel's music, on one occasion proposing an alternate arrangement of "Mother Knows Best". Murphy envisioned her character as an entertainer who "envisions herself periodically being hit with a spotlight", which ultimately influenced her performance on "Mother Knows Best", and claims to have learned more about her character's true wickedness by recording the song. After hearing "Mother Knows Best" for the first time, animator Jin Kim conceived a "1940s Hollywood screen siren motif" for Gothel's appearance and personality.

Context and use in Tangled 
Taking place in the film's first act, "Mother Knows Best" begins during the first fifteen minutes of Tangled. On the eve of her eighteenth birthday, Rapunzel finally musters the courage to ask for Gothel's permission to see the mysterious floating lanterns in person. Gothel, whose eternal youth and beauty relies on the preservation of Rapunzel's magical hair, warns her ward that the outside world is rife with selfish people who wish to steal and take advantage of her hair. Claiming to only want to protect her, Gothel insists the refusal is for Rapunzel's own good. "Mother Knows Best" is Gothel's attempt to justify keeping Rapunzel imprisoned indefinitely, going to great lengths to convince Rapunzel that she is better off staying home, while sarcastically reminding her that "mother knows best". Gothel simultaneously lists all possible reasons Rapunzel could never survive without her, while telling her how much she cares. Rapunzel believes Mother Gothel has the best intentions despite audience's full knowledge that she is only being used for Gothel's personal gain. Softonic.com wrote that upon first hearing the song audiences might not think it is being performed by the film's villain, who seemingly "apparently worried about the dangers of the outside world – all she wants to do is protect her daughter". Writing for the Tulsa World, Michael Smith said Gothel uses the song "as her lie/rationale for keeping the girl safe (holding her hostage) from those who might steal her for their own hair-inspired profit schemes", manipulating her into remaining home by scaring and guilt tripping her. A writer for Disney.com observed, "The creepiness of this song lies in the fact that the very untrustworthy Mother Gothel is positioning herself as a helpful figure to Rapunzel".

At one point during the scene, Gothel actually contradicts herself, forbidding Rapunzel from asking to leave the tower ever again by the end of the musical number. According to Amid Amidi of Cartoon Brew, the scene alternates between being funny and scary, citing Gothel's "theatrical gestures" and "claustrophobia-inducing stark black backgrounds" as examples of each. Moviefone's William Goss cited the musical number as an example of "fear-mongering". According to Jennie Punter of The Globe and Mail, the sequence "hilariously convey[s] the fear and guilt that have kept Rapunzel in the tower of her own free will". In her book Marvels & Tales, author Kendra Magnusson observed that, during the "Mother Knows Best" musical sequence, "the manipulation of Rapunzel's hair leaves the heroine's body wrenched in one moment and bound up in it the next", depicting that, while Rapunzel's hair can be used to defend herself, "it is simultaneously a liability" and can just as well be used to harm her.

In the book How Fairy Tales Live Happily Ever After: (Analyzing) the Art of Adapting Fairy Tales, author Conny Eisfeld observed that "Mother Knows Best" emphasizes Gothel's "status of superiority" over Rapunzel, in spite of the fact that "her existence solely depend[s] on Rapunzel". A writer for Bitch felt "Mother Knows Best" is Gothel's strongest demonstration of being an abusive mother that the entire film has to offer, with Charlie Ridgley of Comicbook.com writing that it establishes "just how little she actually cares for Rapunzel". Critics have often identified the sequence as one of the film's darkest and edgiest moments. Glen Chapman of Den of Geek wrote that the scene "strikes a balance between melodic and narrative sophistication, as well as being equal parts sweet and sinister." Gothel later reprises the song "in indelible fashion." According to Barry Levitt of /Film, the reprise finally allows Rapunzel "to see just how cruel and manipulative her captor-mother can be".

Music and lyrics 
According to the song's official sheet music, "Mother Knows Best" is performed "with rubato" in the key of F major, at a moderate speed of 66 beats per minute. Critics have described the song as a "brash", Broadway-style ballad. Lasting three minutes and ten seconds, "Mother Knows Best" is the second-longest song on the film's soundtrack, behind the Mandy Moore-Zachary Levi duet "I See the Light". According to Tom Charity of CNN, "Mother Knows Best" is a "grand, theatrical number", which some reviewers have stated also contains jazz and pop influences. Michael Smith of the Tulsa World referred to the song as "a bouncy little Freudian nightmare", and Varietys Justin Chang dubbed it an "authoritarian anthem". Describing "Mother Knows Best" as a "fiery" musical number, Andrew L. Urban of Urban Cinefile said the song is "as theatrical as is [its] character". According to Anthony Quinn of The Independent, "Mother Knows Best" is a "creepy-funny ode to self-interest", whereas Joe Williams of the St. Louis Post-Dispatch described its musical undertones as "mercenary". A writer for Filmtracks.com observed that its "lovely romantic melody and instrumentation is betrayed by its absolutely evil lyrics". Similarly, Softonic.com reported that "never before has such a sweet tune hidden so much evil".

Featuring dark, humorous lyrics, "Mother Knows Best" is about overprotecting someone in order to hide the truth from them. Being about maintaining control over someone, "Mother Knows Best" is distinguished from Tangled's other more empowering, adventurous songs. Io9 contributor Meredith Goerner described the ballad as a "twisted song about" a mother "sheltering her fake daughter from the real world so she can live forever". The song's lyrics cite several factors Gothel claims are a danger to Rapunzel's well-being, such as ruffians, thugs, poison ivy, quicksand, cannibals, snakes, and the plague, to deter her from leaving their secluded tower. Using passive-aggressive insults, the song opens with Murphy speaking, "You want to go outside? Why, Rapunzel!", and features the line "skip the drama, stay with mama". John Roebuck of ReelGood said its lyrics are essentially "Snide remarks ... disguised as a mothers concern". Writing for Slant Magazine, Christian Blauvelt found its lyrics similar to "Out There" from Disney's The Hunchback of Notre Dame (1996), specifically Judge Claude Frollo's verse; both songs were composed by Menken. Also comparing the song to Menken's previous work, AllMusic's James Christopher Monger said "Mother Knows Best" is "cut from the same pop cloth as all of the late 20th/early 21st century Disney offerings".

Murphy's vocal range on the song spans approximately two octaves, from F3 to C5. According to James Kendrick of QNetwork Entertainment Portal, the song allows Murphy "to stretch her Broadway vocal chops", which Proma Khosla of Mashable likened to "a true Broadway diva going in for the kill". Playbill'''s Ruthie Fierberg felt Murphy discovered "new ways to use her belt and her delicate coloratura". Writing for Little White Lies, Georgie Hobbs said the actress "performs  ... with a schizophrenic frenzy", likening "Mother Knows Best" to the work of Broadway songwriter Stephen Sondheim. Dan Kois of The Village Voice compared the song to Sondheim's musical Gypsy, while Norman Wilner of Now said Murphy's vocals reminded him of Broadway actress Patti LuPone, which according to Marjorie Baumgarten of The Austin Chronicle "drip[s] with sarcasm and biting wit". Meanwhile, Tim Robey of The Daily Telegraph likened Murphy's performance to actress and singer Julie Andrews, describing it jokingly as "Julie-Andrews-on-stimulants".

According to Bitch, the song's reprise "features far darker harmonies and a slightly revised melody as compared to the original rendition of the song." Additionally, the reprise serves as a "dark twist on the original performance with a much more ominous sound in both the singing and the orchestration".

Reception
"Mother Knows Best" has garnered widespread acclaim from film and music critics, several of whom praised the song despite being otherwise unimpressed with most of Tangled's musical numbers. Writing for The Blade, Kirk Baird said the film's songs "aren't particularly memorable" apart from "Mother Knows Best". Lindsey Ward of Canoe.ca agreed, writing that "Murphy alone turns [the song] into a giant spectacle with her voice". Richard Corliss of Time called "Mother Knows Best" "a pot of poisoned honey". Michael Smith, writing for the Tulsa World, felt the song's darkness offers Tangled "a bitter balance for the sugar and spice" by recalling "the nasty bits of the original Grimm's fairy tale". Mal Vincent of The Virginian-Pilot described the song as "a good villain entry". Critics have unanimously hailed "Mother Knows Best" as the film's best song. Declaring it the musical standout of Tangled, Georgie Hobbs of Little White Lies deemed the ballad "worthy of the very best of [Stephen] Sondheim's crazed heroines". Calling it a "potential Broadway showstopper", Steve Persall of the Tampa Bay Times described "Mother Knows Best" as "a knockout". Also singling out the track as the film's "finest number", Dan Kois of The Village Voice felt the track was worthy of Mama Rose from the musical Gypsy (1959), a sentiment echoed by Andrea Gronvall of the Chicago Tribune who wrote "Murphy channel[ed] all the monstrous smothering power of Mama Rose in Gypsy". Lou Lumenick of the New York Post felt the songwriters had reserved the film's true showstopper for Murphy. According to an article written by William Bibbiani of Mandatory in 2017, "Mother Knows Best" remains one of Menken's richest, most subversive Disney compositions. Calling the song as "terrifically catchy", Barry Levitt of /Film described "Mother Knows Best" as "a masterclass in manipulation and passive-aggressiveness".Murphy's vocals have also been enthusiastically reviewed, which Filmtracks.com felt were "more accomplished" than Moore's. Critics likened her vocals to performances by Patti LuPone and Julia Andrews. Rolling Stone film critic Peter Travers hailed them as "comic bliss with a sting in its tail". 7x7s Rossiter Drake called her efforts "a welcome revelation", while The Austin Chronicles Marjorie Baumgarten praised Murphy's showmanship. Tom Charity of CNN commended the actress for treating the musical number like "the showstopper it deserves to be". Describing "Mother Knows Best" as "belted out wonderfully by Murphy", Linda Cook of the Quad-City Times concluded that the actress "makes the purchase of the soundtrack worthwhile". Christian Blauvelt of Slant Magazine wrote, "If a couple of Menken's songs feel less than soaring, it's due only to the limited pop-star vocals of Mandy Moore", but "when Broadway vet Murphy takes to scaling Menken's octave-climbing melodies like a vocal escalator, it's a different story". Sandie Angulo Chen of Common Sense Media said Murphy's vocals are "on fabulous display in the amazing number", and William Goss of Moviefone said she belts it "perfectly". In review of the film's soundtrack, AllMusic critic James Christopher Monger observed that both Murphy and Moore "take on the lion's share of the work, and ... deliver the goods". Josh Spiegel of Screen Crush said Murphy is "a caustic delight" in "Mother Knows Best".

In a mixed review, Wesley Morris of The Boston Globe enjoyed the quality of the song itself and Menken's songwriting, but felt that it was unnecessary and melodramatic. James Berardinelli of ReelViews gave the song a negative review, feeling that it was equally as unmemorable as the other tracks and writing, "It's hard to imagine someone humming ... 'Mother Knows Best' when leaving the theater".

TVOvermind and Mashable ranked "Mother Knows Best" Disney's fifth best villain song. According to Screen Rant's Jordan Payeur, who ranked "Mother Knows Best" the third-best Disney villain song, the tune "portrays how selfish and manipulative she is". Hillary Busis of Entertainment Weekly ranked "Mother Knows Best" Disney's ninth best villain song, writing that Gothel "can't elevate it higher than the middle of the pack" despite her "admirable swagger". Ranking the song seventh, Comicbook.com's Charlie Ridgely believes "the intention behind the lyrics are what really set it apart as one of the great Disney villain numbers". Io9 ranked the song 11th on the website's list of "The 36 Greatest Supervillain Musical Numbers of All Time." BuzzFeed ranked "Mother Knows Best" 9th on its list of "The 12 Greatest Disney Villain Songs". Selecting it as a top audition song for female singers, Rebecca Strassberg of Backstage said "Mother Knows Best" "allows singers to get gritty".

 Live performances and use in media 
In 2021, actress Melora Hardin and professional dance partner Artem Chigvintsev performed a jazz routine to Hardin's cover of "Mother Knows Best" on the reality television dance competition Dancing with the Stars''. Hardin's performance received unanimous praise from the judges, earning the highest score of the "Disney Villains"-themed portion of the episode, as well as the season's first 10.

Certifications

Notes

References

2010 songs
Songs from Tangled
Songs with lyrics by Glenn Slater
Songs with music by Alan Menken
Song recordings produced by Alan Menken
Songs about mothers